The Hippomobile is an automobile invented by Étienne Lenoir in 1863 which carried its own internal combustion engine. It was based on his 1860 invention, the Lenoir gas engine.

History
In 1863 the Hippomobile, powered by one cylinder internal combustion engine, made a test drive from Paris to Joinville-le-Pont, covering about eleven miles in less than three hours. This was a fair achievement at the time.

See also
 History of the internal combustion engine
 Motorized wagons
 Timeline of transportation technology

References

External links
 Engine Maturity, Efficiency, and Potential Improvements US Dept of Energy, Washington, page 7

1860s cars
1863 introductions
Hydrogen cars